Angelo Loukakis is an Australian author. He was born in Australia, attended Fort Street High School, studied English literature at the University of New South Wales, and acquired a Dip. Ed. from Sydney Teachers College and a doctorate in creative arts from the University of Technology, Sydney. He has worked as a teacher, editor, publisher and scriptwriter. Loukakis is the author of three novels: Messenger, The Memory of Tides, and Houdini's Flight; two collections of short stories, as well as non-fiction work, such as a children's book on Greeks in Australia, a book on ancestry based on the Australian version of the television series Who Do You Think You Are? and a travel book on Norfolk Island.

Loukakis’s parents came from the island of Crete, Greece and his novel, The Memory of Tides, which has as a backdrop the Battle of Crete, honours their generation. Of that novel he has said:

I wanted to show the extraordinary and positive relationships that were formed between Greeks and Aussies at a time of profound crisis. There were many instances of cross-cultural revelation during the Greek campaign. For humble, frightened village people an awakening and relief—they could scarcely believe that complete strangers would come from across the world to try to protect them from the Nazi tyrants. For Aussie boys, an awareness of a culture that had given birth to the very things they were fighting for—freedom and democracy.

His collection of short stories For the Patriarch received an award at the 1981 NSW Premier's Awards and was set on the NSW HSC syllabus between 1986 and 2001. He was the script writer for the 1980 film Dancing, directed by George Whaley and produced by David Elfick, which was shown at the Melbourne International Film Festival. He was writer of the SBS television series drama The Girl from Steel City, screened 1987-88 The Girl from Steel City.

Angelo Loukakis was a member of the Literature Board of the Australia Council (1985–87), founding Chair of the NSW Writers' Centre (1991), and Executive Director of the Australian Society of Authors (2010–16).

Bibliography 

Norfolk: An Island and Its People (Adelaide: Rigby, 1984)
Vernacular Dreams (St. Lucia, Qld.: University of Queensland Press, 1986)
Messenger (Ringwood, Vic.: Penguin, 1992)
The Memory of Tides (Pymble, N.S.W.: HarperCollins Publishers, 2006)
Who Do You Think You Are? (Sydney, N.S.W.: Pan Macmillan, 2008)
Houdini's Flight (Pymble, N.S.W.: HarperCollins Publishers, 2010)

References

External links
Angelo Loukakis at http://www.austlit.edu.au/run?ex=ShowAgent&agentId=A(9l
Angelo Loukakis: The Memory of Tides (reviews) at https://web.archive.org/web/20091011130732/http://www.theaustralian.news.com.au/story/0,25197,20398442-5001123,00.html.
Review of The Memory of Tides by Liam Davison at http://www.travel-to-crete.com/page.php?page_id=486
Review of Houdini's Flight by Peter Pierce at http://www.theage.com.au/entertainment/books/houdinis-flight-20100618-ym5g.html

Living people
20th-century Australian novelists
21st-century Australian novelists
Australian male novelists
Australian people of Greek descent
Australian male short story writers
20th-century Australian short story writers
21st-century Australian short story writers
20th-century Australian male writers
21st-century Australian male writers
Year of birth missing (living people)